Events from the year 1985 in the United Kingdom.

Incumbents
 Monarch – Elizabeth II
 Prime Minister – Margaret Thatcher (Conservative)
 Parliament – 49th

Events

January
 January
 The Fraud Investigation Group is set up for cases of financial and commercial fraud.
 The Waterside Inn at Bray, Berkshire, founded by the brothers Michel and Albert Roux, becomes the first establishment in the UK to be awarded three Michelin Guide stars, a distinction which it retains for at least twenty-five years.
 The first mobile phone network in the UK is launched by Vodafone. (The second would be Cellnet, on 7 January.)
 7 January – Nine striking coalminers are jailed for arson.
 10 January
 The Sinclair C5, a battery-assisted recumbent tricycle, designed by the British inventor Clive Sinclair is launched.
 Eight people are killed in an explosion in Putney.
 16 January – London's Dorchester Hotel is bought by the Sultan of Brunei.
 17 January – British Telecom announces it is going to phase out its iconic red telephone boxes.
 23 January – A debate in the House of Lords is televised for the first time.
 29 January – Margaret Thatcher becomes the first post-war Prime Minister to be publicly refused an honorary degree by Oxford University.

February
 10 February – Nine people are killed in a multiple crash on the M6 motorway.
 16 February – Civil servant Clive Ponting resigns from the Ministry of Defence after his acquittal of breaching section 2 of the Official Secrets Act 1911 concerning the leaking of documents relating to the sinking of the ARA General Belgrano during the Falklands War.
 19 February – EastEnders, the BBC One soap opera set in the fictional London Borough of Walford, debuts.
 25 February – UK miners' strike (1984–85): Nearly 4,000 striking coalminers return to work, meaning that only just over half of the miners are now on strike.
 26 February – Following his trial and conviction at St Albans Crown Court, Malcolm Fairley, the sex attacker known as The Fox, is handed six life sentences.
 28 February – 1985 Newry mortar attack: The Provisional Irish Republican Army carries out a mortar attack on the Royal Ulster Constabulary police station in Newry, killing nine officers in the highest loss of life for the RUC on a single day.

March
 3 March – The UK Miners' Strike, involving at its peak 142,000 coalminers, ends after one year.
 7 March – Two IRA members are jailed for 35 years at the Old Bailey for plotting the bombing campaign across London during 1981.
 11 March – Mohammed Al Fayed buys the London-based department store company Harrods.
 13 March – Rioting breaks out at the FA Cup quarter-final between Luton Town and Millwall at Kenilworth Road, Luton; hundreds of hooligans tear seats from the stands and throw them onto the pitch before a pitch invasion takes place, resulting in 81 people (31 of them police officers) being injured. The carnage continues in the streets near the stadium, resulting in major damage to vehicles and property. Luton Town win the game 1–0.
 19 March
 After beginning the year with a lead of up to eight points in the opinion poll, the Conservatives suffer a major blow as the latest MORI poll puts them four points behind Labour, who have a 40% share of the vote.
 Ford launches the third generation of its Granada. It is sold only as a hatchback, in contrast to its predecessor which was sold as a saloon or estate and in continental Europe it will be known as the Scorpio.

April
 11 April – An eighteen-month-old boy becomes the youngest person in the UK to die of HIV/AIDS.
 22 April – Construction of Japanese carmaker Nissan's new factory at Sunderland, Tyne and Wear, begins. The first cars are expected to be produced next year.
 30 April – Bernie Grant, born in Guyana, becomes the first black council leader when he is elected as leader of the Labour-controlled London Borough of Haringey council.

May
 2 May – The SDP–Liberal Alliance makes big gains in local council elections.
 11 May
 56 people are killed in the Bradford City stadium fire.
 A 14-year-old boy is killed, 20 people are injured and several vehicles are wrecked when Leeds United football hooligans riot at the Birmingham City stadium and cause a wall to collapse.
 13 May – The Dire Straits album Brothers in Arms is released; it becomes the first compact disc to sell over 1,000,000 copies.
 15 May – Everton, who have already clinched their first Football League title for fifteen years, win the European Cup Winners' Cup, their first European trophy, with a 3–1 win over Rapid Vienna in Rotterdam. English clubs have now won 25 European trophies since 1963. Everton are also in contention for a treble of major trophies, as they take on Manchester United in the FA Cup final in three days.
 16 May
 Two South Wales miners are sentenced to life imprisonment for the murder of taxi driver David Wilkie. Dean Hancock and Russell Shankland, both twenty-one years old, dropped a concrete block on Mr. Wilkie's taxi from a road overbridge in November last year.
 Scientists of the British Antarctic Survey discover the ozone hole.
 18 May – Manchester United win the FA Cup for the sixth time in their history with a 1–0 win over Everton in the final at Wembley Stadium. The only goal of the game is scored by twenty-year-old Northern Irish forward Norman Whiteside, who scored in United's last FA Cup triumph two years earlier.
 29 May – In the Heysel Stadium disaster at the European Cup final in Brussels, 39 football fans die and hundreds are injured. Despite the tragedy, the match is played and Juventus beat Liverpool 1–0.
 31 May – The Football Association bans all English football clubs from playing in Europe until further notice in response to the Heysel riots. Thatcher supports the ban and calls for judges to hand out stiffer sentences to convicted football hooligans.

June
 1 June – Battle of the Beanfield, Britain's largest mass arrest and the effective end of Stonehenge Free Festivals.
 2 June – In response to the Heysel Stadium disaster four days ago, UEFA bans all English football clubs from European competitions for an indefinite period, recommending that Liverpool should serve an extra three years of exclusion once all other English clubs have been reinstated.
 6 June – Birmingham unveils its bid to host the 1992 Summer Olympics, which includes plans for a new £66,000,000 stadium.
 13 June – The fourteenth James Bond film – A View to a Kill – is released, marking the seventh and final appearance by Roger Moore as the fictional secret agent after six films since 1973.
 22 June – Police arrest thirteen suspects in connection with the Brighton hotel bombing of 1984.
 29 June – Patrick Magee is charged with the murder of the people who died in the Brighton bombing eight months ago.

July
 4 July 
 13-year-old Ruth Lawrence achieves a first in Mathematics at the University of Oxford, becoming the youngest British person ever to earn a first-class degree and the youngest known graduate of the university.
 Unemployment for June falls to 3,178,582 from May's total of 3,240,947, the best fall in unemployment of the decade so far.
 13 July – Live Aid pop concerts in London and Philadelphia raise over £50,000,000 for famine relief in Ethiopia.
 24 July – Country code top-level domain .uk registered.
 25 July–4 August – The World Games take place in London.
 29 July – Despite unemployment having fallen since October last year, it has increased in 73 Conservative constituencies, according to government figures.

August
 7 August – Five people are found killed in the White House Farm murders in Essex. Nevill and June Bamber, a couple in their sixties, are found shot dead, as is their 27-year-old adoptive daughter Sheila Caffell and her six-year-old twin sons Daniel and Nicholas. The crime is initially treated by the police and reported by the media as a murder-suicide committed by Sheila Caffell, who had a long history of mental health issues.
 13 August
 The first UK heart-lung transplant is carried out at the Harefield Hospital in Middlesex. The patient is three-year-old Jamie Gavin.
 The Sinclair C5 ceases production after just seven months and fewer than 17,000 units.
 22 August – 55 people are killed in the Manchester air disaster at Manchester International Airport when a British Airtours Boeing 737 burst into flames after the pilot aborts the take-off.
 24 August – Five-year-old John Shorthouse is shot dead by police at his family's house in Birmingham, where they were arresting his father on suspicion of an armed robbery committed in South Wales.

September
 September
 SEAT, the Spanish carmaker originally a subsidy of Fiat but now under controlling interest from Volkswagen, begins importing cars to the United Kingdom. Its range consists of the Marbella (a rebadged version of the Fiat Panda), the Ibiza hatchback and Malaga saloon.
 United Kingdom BSE outbreak: Earliest confirmed case of bovine spongiform encephalopathy in British cattle, by post-mortem examination of a cow from Sussex, although not confirmed as such until June 1987.
 2 September – England win the 1985 Ashes series in cricket.
 4 September – The first photographs and films of the RMS Titanic'''s wreckage are taken, 73 years after it sank.
 6 September – The Scottish Exhibition and Conference Centre opens in Glasgow. 
 8 September – Jeremy Bamber is arrested on suspicion of murdering his adoptive parents, sister and two nephews in last month's White House Farm murders. 
 9 September – Rioting, mostly motivated by racial tension, breaks out in the Handsworth area of Birmingham.
 10 September
 The riots in Handsworth escalate, with mass arson and looting resulting in thousands of pounds worth of damage, leaving several people injured, and resulting in the deaths of two people when the local post office is petrol-bombed, one of the fatalities being its owner.
 Scotland national football team manager Jock Stein, 62, collapses and dies from a heart attack at the end of his team's 1–1 draw with Wales at Ninian Park, Cardiff, which secured Scotland's place in the World Cup qualification play-off.
 11 September
 The rioting in Handsworth ends, with the final casualty toll standing at 35 injuries and two deaths. A further two people are unaccounted for. Enoch Powell, the controversial former-Conservative MP who was dismissed from the Shadow Cabinet seventeen years earlier for his Rivers of Blood speech on immigration, states that the riots in Handsworth were a vindication of the warnings he voiced in 1968.
 The England national football team secures qualification for next summer's World Cup in Mexico with a 1–1 draw against Romania at Wembley. Tottenham midfielder Glenn Hoddle scores England's only goal.
 17 September – Margaret Thatcher's hopes of winning a third term in office at the next general election are thrown into doubt by the results of an opinion poll, which shows the Conservatives in third place on 30%, Labour in second place on 33% and the SDP–Liberal Alliance in the lead on 35%.
 28 September  
 A riot in Brixton erupts after an accidental shooting of a woman by police. One person dies in the riot, fifty are injured and more than 200 are arrested.
 Manchester United's excellent start to the Football League First Division season sees them win their tenth league game in succession, leaving them well-placed to win their first league title since 1967.
 29 September – Jeremy Bamber is rearrested upon his return to England after two weeks on holiday in France and charged with the five White House Farm murders.

October
 1 October
 Neil Kinnock makes a speech at the Labour Party Conference in Bournemouth attacking the entryist Militant group in Liverpool.
 Lord Scarman's report on the riots in Toxteth and Peckham blames economic deprivation and racial discrimination.
 Economists predict that unemployment will remain above the 3,000,000 mark for the rest of the decade.
 3 October – South Georgia and the South Sandwich Islands are separated from the Falkland Islands Dependencies.
 5 October – Mrs. Cythnia Jarrett, a 49-year-old black woman, dies after falling over during a police search of her home on the Broadwater Farm estate in Tottenham, London.
 6 October – PC Keith Blakelock is fatally stabbed during the Broadwater Farm Riot in Tottenham, London, which began after the death of Cynthia Jarrett yesterday. Two of his colleagues are treated in hospital for gunshot wounds, as are three journalists.
 15 October – The SDP-Liberal Alliance's brief lead in the opinion polls is over, with the Conservatives now back in the lead by a single point over Labour in the latest MORI poll.
 17 October – The House of Lords decides the legal case of Gillick v West Norfolk and Wisbech Area Health Authority, which sets the significant precedent of Gillick competence, i.e. that a child of sixteen or under may be competent to consent to contraception or – by extension – other medical treatment without requiring parental permission or knowledge.
 24 October – Members of Parliament react to the recent wave of rioting, by saying that unemployment is an unacceptable excuse for the riots.
 28 October – Production of the Peugeot 309 begins at the Ryton car factory near Coventry. The 309, a small family hatchback, is the first "foreign" car to be built in the UK. It was originally going to be badged as the Talbot Arizona, but Peugeot has decided that the Talbot badge will be discontinued on passenger cars after next year and that the Ryton plant will then be used for the production of its own products, including a larger four-door saloon (similar in size to the Ford Sierra) which is due in two years.
 30 October – Unemployment is reported to have risen in nearly 70% of the Conservative held seats since October 1984.
 31 October – The two miners who killed taxi driver David Wilkie in South Wales eleven months earlier, have their life sentences for murder reduced to eight years for manslaughter on appeal.

November
 1 November  
 Aircraft carrier HMS Ark Royal is commissioned by the Queen Mother.
 Unemployment for September falls by nearly 70,000 to less than 3,300,000.
 5 November – Mark Kaylor defeats Errol Christie to become the middleweight boxing champion, after the two brawl in front of the cameras at the weigh-in.
 9 November – The Prince and Princess of Wales (Charles and Diana) arrive in the United States for a visit to Ronald Reagan in Washington, D.C.
 15 November – Anglo-Irish Agreement signed at Hillsborough Castle. Treasury Minister Ian Gow resigns in protest at the deal.
 17 November – The Confederation of British Industry calls for the government to invest £1,000,000,000 in unemployment relief – a move which would cut unemployment by 350,000 and potentially bring it below 3,000,000 for the first time since late-1981.
 18 November – A coach crash on the M6 motorway near Birmingham kills two people and injures 51 others.
 19 November – The latest MORI poll shows that Conservative and Labour support is almost equal at around 36%, with the SDP–Liberal Alliance's hopes of electoral breakthrough left looking bleak as they have polled only 25% of the vote.
 22 November – Margaret Thatcher is urged by her MPs to call a general election for June 1987, despite the deadline not being until June 1988 and recent opinion polls frequently showing Labour and the Alliance equal with the Conservatives, although the Conservative majority has remained well into triple figures.
 25 November – Department store chains British Home Stores and Habitat announce a £1,500,000,000 amalgamation.
 27 November – Labour Party leader Neil Kinnock suspends the Liverpool District Labour Party amid allegations that the Trotskyist Militant group is attempting to control it.
 29 November
 A gas explosion kills four people in Glasgow.
 Gérard Hoarau, exiled political leader from the Seychelles, is assassinated in London.

December
 December – Builders Alfred McAlpine complete construction of Nissan's new car factory at Sunderland. Nissan can now install machinery and factory components and car production is expected to begin by the summer of next year.
 4 December – Scotland's World Cup qualification is secured by a goalless draw with Australia in the play-off second leg in Sydney.
 5 December – It is announced that unemployment fell in November, for the third month running. It now stands at 3,165,000.
 25 December – Charitable organisation Comic Relief is launched.
 26 December – Rock star Phil Lynott (36), formerly a member of the band Thin Lizzy, is rushed to hospital after collapsing from a suspected heroin overdose at his home in Berkshire. He will die on 4 January 1986.

Undated
 Inflation stands at 6.1% – the highest since 1982, but still low compared to the highs reached in the 1970s.
 Peak year for British oil production: 127,000,000 tonnes.
 The first retailers move into the Merry Hill Shopping Centre near Dudley, West Midlands. A new shopping centre is scheduled to open alongside the developing retail park in April 1986 and it is anticipated to grow into Europe's largest indoor shopping centre with further developments set to be completed by 1990, as well as including a host of leisure facilities.

Publications
 Margaret Atwood's novel The Handmaid's Tale.
 Iain Banks's novel Walking on Glass.
 Jilly Cooper's novel Riders, first of the Rutshire Chronicles.
 Tony Harrison's poem V.
 Jeanette Winterson's novel Oranges Are Not the Only Fruit.

Births
 1 January – Steven Davis, footballer
 4 January – Lenora Crichlow, actress
 6 January – Hugh Skinner, actor
 7 January 
Lewis Hamilton, Formula One racing driver
Wayne Routledge, English footballer
 11 January – Newton Faulkner, rock musician
 16 January – Craig Jones, motorcycle racer (died 2008)
 24 January – Ian Henderson, footballer
 26 January 
Rusko, musician
Heather Stanning, rower
 28 January – Tom Hopper, actor
 1 February – Dean Shiels, footballer
 10 February – Cath Rae, Scottish field hockey goalkeeper
 16 February – Simon Francis, footballer
 20 February – Michael Oliver, football referee
 3 March – Sam Morrow, footballer
 7 March –  Gerwyn Price, darts player
 17 March – Dominic Adams, actor and model
 26 March – Keira Knightley, actress 
 1 April – Beth Tweddle, gymnast
 3 April – Leona Lewis, singer
 7 April – Humza Yousaf, Scottish politician
 8 April – Gareth Rees, cricketer
 20 April – Amanda Fahy, actress
 2 May – Lily Allen, singer
 15 May – James Dean, footballer (died 2021)
 21 May 
 Mutya Buena, urban singer (Sugababes)
 Alison Carroll, artistic gymnast, actress and model
 Alex Danson, field hockey forward
 22 May – Stuart Tomlinson, footballer and wrestler
 28 May – Carey Mulligan, actress
 6 June – Drew McIntyre, wrestler
 7 June 
 Charlie Simpson, singer-songwriter
 Simon Whaley, footballer
 24 June – Tom Kennedy, footballer
 28 June – Phil Bardsley, footballer
 3 July – Dean Cook, actor
 5 July – Nick O'Malley, musician 
 9 July – Ashley Young, footballer
 13 July – Charlotte Dujardin, dressage rider
 14 July – Phoebe Waller-Bridge, comic actress and screenwriter
 22 July – Blake Harrison, actor
 30 July – Aml Ameen, actor
 15 August – Verity Rushworth, actress
 19 September – Sarah Hunter, rugby player
 24 September – Kimberley Nixon, actress
 26 September – Talulah Riley, actress
 28 September – Luke Chambers, football player and manager
 29 September – Mark Fletcher, politician
 1 October – Emerald Fennell, screen actress and director
 6 October – Mitchell Cole, footballer (died 2012)
 9 October – Frankmusik, electropop musician
 24 October – Wayne Rooney, footballer
 25 October
Reanne Evans, snooker player
Sophie Gradon, model and marketing manager (died 2018)
 29 October – Janet Montgomery, film and television actress
 7 November – Paul Terry, actor
 8 November – Jack Osbourne, actor
 28 November – Ryan Sampson, actor
 2 December – Seann Walsh, comedian and actor
 10 December – Ollie Bridewell, motorcycle racer (died 2007)
 17 December – Greg James, radio and television presenter
 19 December – Gary Cahill, English footballer
 21 December – Tom Sturridge, actor
 22 December – Kae Tempest, performance artist
 23 December – Harry Judd, pop rock drummer (McFly)

Deaths
 4 January – Sir Brian Horrocks, general (born 1895)
 18 January – Wilfrid Brambell, Irish-born actor (born 1912)
 26 January – David Ormsby-Gore, 5th Baron Harlech, politician (born 1918)
 6 February – James Hadley Chase, writer (born 1906)
 8 February – Sir William Lyons, automobile engineer and designer, founder of Jaguar Cars (born 1901)
 27 February – Sir Iain Moncreiffe of that Ilk, genealogist and Officer of Arms (born 1919)
 28 February – Ray Ellington, singer, drummer and bandleader (born 1916)
 9 March – Harry Catterick, footballer and football manager (born 1919)
 21 March – Sir Michael Redgrave, actor (born 1908)
 4 April – Kate Roberts, author (born 1891)
 5 April – Arthur Negus, broadcaster and antiques specialist (born 1903)
 11 April – Fred Uhlman, German-English writer, painter and lawyer (born 1901)
 14 April – Noele Gordon, actress (born 1919)
 25 April – Richard Haydn, actor (born 1905)
 5 May – Donald Bailey, civil engineer (born 1901)
 28 May – Roy Plomley, radio broadcaster, producer, playwright and novelist, founder of Desert Island Discs'' (born 1914)
 30 May – George K. Arthur, actor and producer (born 1899)
 2 June – George Brown, politician (born 1914)
 9 June – Clifford Evans, actor (born 1912)
 7 June – Gordon Rollings, British actor (born 1926)
 15 June – Percy Fender, cricketer (born 1892)
 17 June – John Boulting, film director (born 1913)
 2 July – David Purley, racing driver (born 1945)
 8 July – Frank Hampson, illustrator (born 1918)
 9 July – Jimmy Kinnon, founder of Narcotics Anonymous (born 1911)
 23 July – Johnny Wardle, cricketer (born 1923)
 6 August – William Anstruther-Gray, Baron Kilmany, Scottish soldier and politician (born 1905)
 17 August – Lord Avon (Nicholas Eden), Conservative Member of Parliament and son of the late prime minister Anthony Eden (born 1930)
 1 September – Saunders Lewis, writer and founder of the Welsh National Party (Plaid Cymru) (born 1893)
 7 September – Rodney Robert Porter, biochemist, recipient of the Nobel Prize in Physiology or Medicine (born 1917)
 9 September –  John Baker, Baron Baker, scientist and structural engineer (born 1901)
 10 September – Jock Stein, footballer and manager of Scotland (born 1922)
 11 September – William Alwyn, composer (born 1905)
 17 September – Laura Ashley, designer (born 1925)
 22 September – Dickie Henderson, entertainer (born 1922)
 30 October – David Oxley, actor (born 1920)
 2 November – William Lummis, British military historian (born 1886)
 6 November – Hans Keller, Austrian-born British musician and writer (born 1919)
 23 November – Leslie Mitchell, announcer (born 1905)
 2 December – Philip Larkin, poet (born 1922)
 7 December – Robert Graves, writer, died on Majorca (born 1895)
 12 December – Ian Stewart, musician (born 1938)

See also
 1985 in British music
 1985 in British television
 List of British films of 1985

References

 
Years of the 20th century in the United Kingdom
United Kingdom